Khalid Anwer (Urdu/; born 4 November 1938 in Delhi, British India in a Nobal Arain Family) is a Pakistani lawyer, jurist and  constitutional expert who previously served as the federal Minister for Law, Justice and Human Rights following his appointment in  1997. He remained in office until the 1999 Pakistani coup d'état led by General Pervez Musharraf which toppled the ruling government of Nawaz Sharif. He is the son of Chaudhry Muhammad Ali, a freedom fighter and the fourth Prime Minister of Pakistan who was notable for having played a role in the formation of the first Constitution of Pakistan in 1956.

Anwer obtained a B.Sc (Hons.) degree from the University of the Punjab and later a B.A. (Hons.) degree from Cambridge. In addition, he is a barrister-at-law from the Inner Temple, England. In March 1997, Anwer was elected as a member of the Senate of Pakistan for a term of six years.

Anwer has an experience of 38 years as a court advocate and legal expert and argues cases relating to constitutional matters in the Supreme Court, as well as commercial issues. In 1993, he played an instrumental role in persuading the Supreme Court to restore the deposed federal government back into office and in 1996, convinced the Supreme Court that the previous government's dismissal was lawful. While in office as the law minister, he sought assistance of the Asian Development Bank for a complete re-haul of Pakistan's entire legal system. Currently, he runs a Karachi-based law firm called Khalid Anwer & Co.

References

1938 births
Children of prime ministers of Pakistan
Law Ministers of Pakistan
Living people
Members of the Senate of Pakistan
Nawaz Sharif administration
Pakistani lawyers
University of the Punjab alumni
Pakistan Muslim League (N) politicians